Oh No! Oh My!' is the debut album of indie rock band Oh No Oh My, released on July 11, 2006.

Track listing
 "Skip the Foreplay" - 3:49
 "Walk in the Park" - 2:22
 "I Have No Sister" - 3:03
 "Reeks and Seeks" - 1:51
 "Lisa, Make Love! (It's Okay!)" - 3:18
 "On the Town" - 2:19
 "I Love You All the Time" - 2:18
 "Jane Is Fat" - 3:47
 "Farewell to All My Friends" - 3:50
 "The Backseat" - 4:36
 "Women Are Born in Love" - 2:32

References

External links
Official website
Myspace website

2006 debut albums
Oh No Oh My albums